The Herald Democrat is a daily newspaper located in the twin cities of Sherman and Denison, Texas, in the United States.  The Herald Democrat serves all of Grayson and Fannin County, Texas; parts of Collin, Cooke, Denton, Delta, Lamar and Hunt County, Texas; and part of Bryan County, Oklahoma.

The Herald Democrat was founded in 1996, when its owner, Stephens Media Group, merged the Denison Herald and the Sherman Democrat. Both papers had been founded in the Texoma area: 1879 in Sherman and 1889 in Denison.

The paper is based in Sherman and has a bureau in downtown Denison.

The Herald Democrat's daily circulation is 18,068 and 18,667 on Sunday, according to the current owner, Gatehouse Media. The newspaper's website had 114,400  unique visitors and 734,400 page views in October 2016.

In 2015, the Stephens Media newspapers were sold to New Media Investment Group, which is part of Gatehouse Media.

Subsidiary Publications 

Anna-Melissa Tribune 
Prosper Press 
Van Alstyne Leader 
Lake Texoma Life Magazine
Grayson County Shopper  
Bryan County News  
Grayson Magazine 
Best of Texoma Magazine

References

External links
 Herald Democrat official web site

Daily newspapers published in Texas
Grayson County, Texas
Gannett publications